Geoffrey R. Fox (19 January 1925 – 31 December 1993) was a professional footballer who played as a full back in The Football League for Ipswich Town, Bristol Rovers and Swindon Town.

Career

Born in Bristol in 1925, Fox played schoolboy football for Bristol City but the outbreak of World War II in 1939 meant that his entry into the professional game was delayed, with League football suspended during the hostilities. He played wartime football as an amateur for Ipswich Town and Bristol City, before signing his first professional contract with Ipswich following the war. After making eleven League appearances for Ipswich, scoring once, Fox returned to his home town with Bristol Rovers in 1955. He remained with The Pirates for eight years, playing in 274 League games during that spell and scoring twice. After two years with Swindon Town between 1955 and 1957, Fox retired from professional football and joined non-league team Pucklechurch as a player-coach.

Fox was also a keen cricketer, playing Minor County cricket for Suffolk, and was on the groundstaff of Gloucestershire County Cricket Club from 1952 until 1954. In later life Fox worked as Sales Director for the Harris paint brush company until retiring in 1990. He died of a Myocardial infarction on New Year's eve 1993 while playing golf.

Honours

Club
Bristol Rovers
 Football League Third Division South Winner (1): 1952–53

References

1925 births
1994 deaths
Footballers from Bristol
English footballers
Association football defenders
Bristol City F.C. wartime guest players
Ipswich Town F.C. players
Colchester United F.C. players
Bristol Rovers F.C. players
Swindon Town F.C. players
English Football League players
Suffolk cricketers